Pachnephorus aequatorianus is a species of leaf beetle found in the Democratic Republic of the Congo, described by Stefano Zoia in 2007. Its name refers to the presence of the species near the equator.

References

Eumolpinae
Beetles of the Democratic Republic of the Congo
Beetles described in 2007
Endemic fauna of the Democratic Republic of the Congo